Armenian National Academic Theatre of Opera and Ballet (Aleksandr Spendiaryani anvan operayi yev baleti azgayin akademiakan tatron) or simply known by locals as Օպերա, Opera is an opera theatre in Yerevan, which was officially opened on 20 January 1933, with Alexander Spendiaryan's Almast opera performance. The opera building was designed by the Armenian architect Alexander Tamanian. It consists of two concert halls: the Aram Khatchaturian concert hall with 1,400 seats and the Alexander Spendiaryan Opera and Ballet National Theatre with 1,200 seats.

Theatre
The ground-breaking of the Opera-Theatre took place on 28 November 1930 during the celebrations of the 10th anniversary of Soviet Armenia. On 20 January 1933, the building was officially opened. Soon after the theatre foundation, a ballet troupe was established. Swan Lake by Pyotr Ilyich Tchaikovsky was the first ballet performance in 1935.

Based on Tamanian's design and under the supervision of his son the theatre hall was completed in 1939, and the opera building was renamed after Alexander Spendiaryan. Large-scale construction works did not finish until 1953, when the entire building was finally completed with its current shape.

The opening of the theatre promoted the creation of new national operas and ballets. The first Armenian ballet was Happiness by Aram Khachaturian. On the basis of this ballet the composer soon created Gayane which has been performed all over the world. Many other Armenian composers have written operas and ballets. Over the years, these artists have worked at the theatre: singers Gohar Gasparyan, Tatevik Sazandaryan, Mihran Yerkat, Pavel Lisitsian, Haykanush Danielyan, Nar Hovhannisyan, Gegham Grigoryan, Anahit Mekhitarian; conductors Konstantin Sarajev, Michael Tavrizyan, Aram Katanyan, Karen Durgaryan, Gianluca Marciano, Yuri Davtyan; ballet masters A. Petrosyan, M. Chmshkyan, Vanush Khanamiryan, Vilen Galstyan, Rudolf Kharatyan; painters Martiros Saryan, Minas Avetisyan.

Since 1935 a unique Armenian opera, Anoush by Armen Tigranian, has been performed in Yerevan opera theatre. It was a great step in Armenian opera history. Anoush is in the repertoire of the theatre until now. One of sopranos currently performing this role is Mary Movsisyan.

Since it was opened, the Armenian National Opera & Ballet Theatre has performed more than 200 different operas and ballets by Armenian, Russian and Western European composers. The theatre company has performed in more than 20 countries, e.g. in Russia, Spain, Lebanon, United States, Greece, Germany. In 1956, the theatre received the status of National Academic Opera and Ballet Theatre.

The theatre has also hosted concerts performed by Charles Aznavour, Ian Anderson, John McLaughlin, Akvarium and many others.

Artistic directors
Romanos Melikian
Tigran Levonyan
Ohan Durian
Gegham Grigoryan
Karen Durgaryan
Constantine Orbelian (since 2016)

Gallery

See also
Vanoush Khanamirian

References

External links
About Yerevan Opera Theatre

Opera houses in Armenia
Ballet companies in Armenia
1933 establishments in the Transcaucasian Socialist Federative Soviet Republic
Tourist attractions in Yerevan
Buildings and structures in Yerevan
Theatres completed in 1933
Music venues completed in 1933